Brandon David Waddell (born June 3, 1994) is an American professional baseball pitcher for the Rakuten Monkeys of the Chinese Professional Baseball League (CPBL). He has played in Major League Baseball (MLB) for the Pittsburgh Pirates, Minnesota Twins, Baltimore Orioles, and St. Louis Cardinals and in the KBO League for the Doosan Bears.

Career

Amateur career
Waddell attended Clear Lake High School in Houston, Texas, and took college level courses at the University of Houston–Clear Lake. He enrolled at the University of Virginia to play college baseball for the Virginia Cavaliers baseball team. Virginia reached the final round in the 2014 College World Series, and he started the must win game two, which Virginia won, but then went on to lose game three. With his extra credits, Waddell graduated from the University of Virginia in three years with a degree in economics, and has been admitted to the masters program in the Curry School of Education at Virginia. He pitched in the deciding game of the 2015 College World Series, earning the win.

Pittsburgh Pirates
The Pittsburgh Pirates selected Waddell in the fifth round of the 2015 MLB draft. He signed with the Pirates, receiving a $315,000 signing bonus. Waddell made his professional debut with the West Virginia Black Bears of the Class A-Short Season New York-Penn League, where he spent the whole season, going 1–1 with a 5.75 ERA in six games. He began the 2016 season with the Bradenton Marauders of the Class A-Advanced Florida State League, and was promoted to the Altoona Curve of the Class AA Eastern League in May. He pitched to a combined 11–9 record with a 3.49 ERA between both teams. Waddell spent 2017 with Altoona where he posted a 3–3 record with a 3.55 ERA in 15 games. He split the 2018 and 2019 seasons between Altoona and the Indianapolis Indians of the Class AAA International League.

On August 9, 2020, Waddell had his contract selected to the 40-man roster. He made his major league debut on August 14 against the Cincinnati Reds.

Minnesota Twins
On October 30, 2020, the Minnesota Twins claimed Waddell off of waivers. On February 11, 2021, Waddell was designated for assignment following the waiver claim of Kyle Garlick. On February 13, Waddell was outrighted and invited to spring training as a non-roster invitee. On April 7, 2021, Waddell was selected to the 40-man and active rosters. After recording an 11.25 ERA in 4 appearances, Waddell was designated for assignment on May 7, 2021.

Baltimore Orioles
On May 8, 2021, Waddell was claimed off of waivers by the Baltimore Orioles. Waddell pitched 1.0 scoreless inning for Baltimore before being designated for assignment on June 4.

St. Louis Cardinals
On June 6, 2021, Waddell was claimed off waivers by the St. Louis Cardinals. Waddell made 4 appearances for the Cardinals in 2021, going 0-1 with a 6.75 ERA and 7 strikeouts. On April 4, 2022, Waddell was designated for assignment by the Cardinals. He was outrighted to the Triple-A Memphis Redbirds on April 7. He was released on July 13.

Doosan Bears
On July 17, 2022, Waddell signed with the Doosan Bears of the Korea Baseball Organization. He made 11 starts for Doosan down the stretch, logging a 5-3 record and 3.60 ERA with 40 strikeouts in 65 innings pitched.

Rakuten Monkeys
On January 14, 2023, Waddell signed with the Rakuten Monkeys of the Chinese Professional Baseball League.

References

External links

1994 births
Living people
Baseball players from Houston
Major League Baseball pitchers
Pittsburgh Pirates players
Minnesota Twins players
Baltimore Orioles players
St. Louis Cardinals players
Virginia Cavaliers baseball players
Curry School of Education alumni
Gulf Coast Pirates players
West Virginia Black Bears players
Bradenton Marauders players
Altoona Curve players
Glendale Desert Dogs players
Indianapolis Indians players
Norfolk Tides players